Court Mistress or Chief Court Mistress (('grand mistress'); ; ;) is or was the title of the senior lady-in-waiting in the courts of Austria, Denmark, Norway, the Netherlands, Sweden, Imperial Russia, and the German princely and royal courts.

Austria

In 1619, a set organisation was finally established for the Austrian Imperial court which came to be the characteristic organisation of the Austrian-Habsburg court roughly kept from this point onward. 
The first rank of the female courtiers was the Obersthofmeisterin, who was second in rank after the empress herself, and responsible for all the female courtiers. Whenever absent, she was replaced by the Fräuleinhofmeisterin, normally in charge of the unmarried female courtiers, their conduct and service.

Chief Court Mistress to Anna of Tyrol, 1608–1618
 1611–1618: Freiin Katharina v. Kollowrath-L.

Chief Court Mistress to Eleonora Gonzaga, 1622–1658
 1621–1624: Gräfin Maria Anna v. Portia 
 1624–1637: Gräfin Ursula v. Attems 
 1637–1644: Freiin Margarita v. Herberstein 
 1647–1647: Gräfin Octavia Strozzi 
 1652–1655: Freiin Anna Eleonora v. Metternich

Chief Court Mistress to Maria Anna of Spain, 1631–1646
 1630–1638: Victoria de Toledo y Colona 
 1643–1646: Marquesa Flores d’Avila

Chief Court Mistress to Maria Leopoldine of Austria, 1648–1649
 1648–1649: Gräfin Anna Eleonora v. Wolkenstein 1648–1649

Chief Court Mistress to Eleonora Gonzaga, 1651–1686
 1651–1658: Gräfin Maria Elisabeth v. Wagensperg

Chief Court Mistress to Maria Theresa of Austria, 1740–1780
 1740–1754: Marie Karoline von Fuchs-Mollard

Chief Court Mistress to Empress Elisabeth of Austria, 1854–1898
 1854–1862: Sophie Esterházy
 1862– : Pauline von Königsegg
 Maria Welser, Gräfin von Welsersheimb Freiin zu Gumpenstein

Denmark

The early modern Danish court was organized according to the German court model, in turn inspired by the Imperial Austrian court model, from the 16th century onward.

The highest rank female courtier to a female royal was the hofmesterinde (Court Mistress) from 1694/98 onward named Overhofmesterinde (Chief Court Mistres), equivalent to the Mistress of the Robes, normally an elder widow, who supervised the rest of the ladies-in-waiting.  

When the office was vacant the tasks were taken over by the second in command, the kammarfröken. This was also the case when the office of hofmesterinde to the queen was left vacant in 1808–23 and 1839–45, and was handled by Friederiche Amalie Marie Hedevig von der Manfe and Marie Ernestine Wilhelmine von Walterstorf respectively.

Chief Court Mistress to Christina of Saxony, 1481–1513
 1490–1496: Sidsel Lunge
 1503–1516: Anne Meinstrup

Chief Court Mistress to Isabella of Austria, 1515–1523
 1516–1517: Anne Meinstrup
 1517–1523: Sigbrit Willoms

Chief Court Mistress to Sophie of Pomerania, 1523–1533
 1526–1533: Anne Meinstrup

Chief Court Mistress to Dorothea of Saxe-Lauenburg, 1534–1571
 1557–1558: Fru Kirstine.
 1558– : Anne Albertsdatter Glob-Urne.

Chief Court Mistress to Sophie of Mecklenburg-Güstrow 1572–1631
 1572–1584: Inger Oxe
 1584–1592: Beate Clausdatter Bille

Chief Court Mistress to Anne Catherine of Brandenburg 1597–1612
 1597–1612: Beate Huitfeldt

Chief Court Mistress to Sophie Amalie of Brunswick-Lüneburg 1648–1685
 Lucie von Løschebrand
 1657–1685: Maria Elisabeth von Haxthausen

Chief Court Mistress to Charlotte Amalie of Hesse-Kassel 1670–1714
 1677–1692: Juliane Elisabeth von Uffeln
 1695–1705: Dorothea Justina Haxthausen
 1705–1707: Sophie Dorothea von Schack von Marschalck 
 Louise Charlotte von Schlaberndorf

Chief Court Mistress to Louise of Mecklenburg-Güstrow 1699–1721
 1699–1716: Abel Cathrine Buchwald

Chief Court Mistress to Anne Sophie Reventlow 1721–1743
 Fru von Grabow

Chief Court Mistress to Sophie Magdalene of Brandenburg-Kulmbach 1721–1770
 Beate Henriette af Reuss-Lobenstein

Chief Court Mistress to Louise of Great Britain 1746–1751
 1746–1751: Christiane Henriette Louise Juel (first term)

Chief Court Mistress to Juliana Maria of Brunswick-Wolfenbüttel 1752–1796
 1752–1754: Christiane Henriette Louise Juel (second term)
 1757–1767: Karen Huitfeldt
 1772–1784: Margrethe von der Lühe
 1784–1793: Sophie Louise Holck-Winterfeldt

Chief Court Mistress to Caroline Matilda of Great Britain 1766–1775
 1766–1768: Louise von Plessen
 1768–1768: Anne Sofie von Berckentin
 1768–1770: Margrethe von der Lühe
 1770–1772: Charlotte Elisabeth Henriette Holstein
 1772–1775: Cathrine Charlotte von der Horst

Chief Court Mistress to Marie of Hesse-Kassel 1808–1852
 1808–1823: Vacant
 1823–1839: Lucie Charlotte Sehestedt Juul
 1839–1852: Vacant

Chief Court Mistress to Caroline Amalie of Augustenburg 1839–1881
 1839–1845:  Vacant
 1845–1859: Ingeborg Christiane Rosenørn

Chief Court Mistress to Louise of Hesse-Kassel 1863–1898
 1864–1876: Ida Marie Bille
 1876–1888: Julia Adelaide Harriet Raben-Levetzau
 1888–1898: Louise Bille-Brahe (first term)

Chief Court Mistress to Louise of Sweden 1906–1926
 1906–1910: Louise Bille-Brahe (second term)

Chief Court Mistress to Alexandrine of Mecklenburg-Schwerin 1912–1952
 1912–1935: Louise Grevenkop-Castenskiold
 1935–1952: Inger Wedell

Germany
The Austrian court model was the role model for the princely courts in Germany, and the post of Obersthofmeisterin, or only hofmeisterin, existed in the princely (and later royal) German courts as well. 

The German court model in turn became the role model of the early modern Scandinavian courts of Denmark and Sweden.

 Chief court mistress to the queens of Prussia and empresses of Germany

Chief Court Mistress to Sophia Louise of Mecklenburg-Schwerin 1708–1713
 Countess von Wittgenstein Valendar

Chief Court Mistress to Sophia Dorothea of Hanover 1713–1757
 Sophie von Kameke
 Susanna Magdalena Finck von Finckenstein

Chief Court Mistress to Elisabeth Christine of Brunswick-Wolfenbüttel-Bevern 1740–1797
 1740–1742: Christiane von Katsch (the same position with the crown princess since 1733)
 1742–1766: Sophie Caroline von Camas
 1766–1797: Charlotte Albertine von Kannenberg

Chief Court Mistress to Frederika Louisa of Hesse-Darmstadt 1786–1805

Chief Court Mistress to Louise of Mecklenburg-Strelitz 1797–1810
 1797–1810: Sophie Marie von Voß (the same position with the crown princess since 1793)

Chief Court Mistress to Elisabeth Ludovika of Bavaria 1840–1873
 Wilhelmine van Reede-Ginkel

Chief Court Mistress to Augusta of Saxe-Weimar-Eisenach 1861–1891
 Gabriele von Bülow

Chief Court Mistress to Augusta Victoria of Schleswig-Holstein 1888–1918
 Therese von Brockdorff

The Netherlands
In the 16th-century, the principal lady-in-waiting in the courts of the Habsburg governors of the Netherlands, Margaret of Austria and Mary of Hungary (governor of the Netherlands), was named hofmesterees ('Court mistress') or dame d'honneur. 

The principal female office holder in the royal court of the Kingdom of the Netherlands in the 19th century was named Grootmeesteres ('Grand Mistress').

Chief Court Mistress to Wilhelmine of Prussia, Queen of the Netherlands, 1815–1837

 1818–1824: Agneta Margaretha Catharina Fagel-Boreel
 1823–1837: Sophie Wilhelmina barones van Heeckeren van Kell (1772–1847)

Chief Court Mistress to Anna Pavlovna of Russia, 1840–1865
 1840–1844: Sophie Wilhelmina barones van Heeckeren van Kell (1772–1847)
 1844–1850: Rose Amour Caroline Aya Gislène(Zézette) Falck, geb. barones De Roisin (1792-1850)
 1850–1852: Johanna Philippina Hermanna barones van Knobelsdorff (1772–1860)

Chief Court Mistress to Sophie of Württemberg, 1849–1877

 1849–1858: Anna Maria Margaretha Deutz van Assendelft – Rendorp (1797–1858)
 1858–1878: Alida van der Oudermeulen barones van Wickevoort Crommelin (1806–1883)

Chief Court Mistress to Emma of Waldeck and Pyrmont, 1879–1934
 1879–1894: Leopoldine Marie gravin van Limburg Stirum (1817–1894)
 1894–1909: Wilhelmina Elizabeth Charlotta gravin Van Lynden van Sandenburg (1869–1930)

Chief Court Mistress to Wilhelmina of the Netherlands, 1890–1962

 1909–1938: Agneta Hendrika Groeninx van Zoelen-Van de Poll (1857–1933)
 1924–1938: Gerarda Cornelia barones van Nagell (1878–1946)
 1938–1954: Cornelie Marie, barones van Tuyll van Serooskerken

Chief Court Mistress to Juliana of the Netherlands, 1948–2004
 1954–1957: Adolphine Agneta barones Van Heeckeren van Molecaten-Groeninx van Zoelen (1885–1967)

Norway
During the union of Sweden-Norway in 1814–1905, Sweden and Norway shared the same royal family. At that time, there were two Chief Court Mistress for the same queen: one as Queen of Sweden at the Swedish royal court when she lived in Sweden, and a separate Chief Court Mistress as Queen of Norway at the Norwegian royal court, who served in her post during the visits of the Swedish-Norwegian royal family to Norway. 

Presently, the overhoffmesterinne in Norway acts as a vice hostess at the Norwegian royal court when the queen and the other female members of the royal family are absent.

Chief Court Mistress to Hedvig Elisabeth Charlotte of Holstein-Gottorp, 1814–1818
 1817–1818: Karen Wedel-Jarlsberg

Chief Court Mistress to Désirée Clary, 1823–1861
 1825–1844: Karen Wedel-Jarlsberg

Chief Court Mistress to Josephine of Leuchtenberg, 1844–1876
 1844–1845: Karen Wedel-Jarlsberg
 1846–1859: Fanny Løvenskiold

Chief Court Mistress to Louise of the Netherlands, 1859–1871
 1859–1871: Juliane Cathrine Wilhelmine Wedel Jarlsberg

Chief Court Mistress to Sophia of Nassau, 1872–1905
 1873–1887: Alette Due
 1887–1905: Elise Løvenskiold

Chief Court Mistress to Maud of Wales, 1905–1938
 1906–1925: Marie Magdalena Rustad 
 1925–1927: Emma Stang
 1927–1938: Borghild Anker

Russia
In 1722, the Russian Imperial court was reorganized in accordance with the reforms of Peter the Great to Westernize Russia, and the old court offices of the Tsarina was replaced with court offices inspired by the German model. Accordingly, the new principal lady in waiting of the Russian empress was named 
Ober-Hofmeisterin.

Chief Court Mistress to Catherine I of Russia 1713–1725

 Matryona Balk
 Agrippina Petrovna Volkonskaia
 1727-1727: Varvara Michajlovna Arsen'eva

Chief Court Mistress to Anna of Russia 1730–1740
 1730-1740: Tatyana Borisovna Golitsyna, spouse of Mikhail Mikhailovich Golitsyn (Field Marshal)

Chief Court Mistress to Elizabeth of Russia 1741–1762
 1741-1750: Tatyana Borisovna Golitsyna, spouse of Mikhail Mikhailovich Golitsyn (Field Marshal)
 1760-1762: Anna Vorontsova

Chief Court Mistress to Catherine II of Russia 1762–1796
 1762-1775: Anna Vorontsova
 1776-1788: Maria Rumyantseva

Chief Court Mistress to Maria Feodorovna (Sophie Dorothea of Württemberg) 1796–1828
 1796-1804: Anna Matyushkina

Chief Court Mistress to Elizabeth Alexeievna (Louise of Baden) 1801–1826
 1823-1825: Alexandra Branitskaya

Chief Court Mistress to Alexandra Feodorovna (Charlotte of Prussia) 1825–1860
 1825-1838: Alexandra Branitskaya

Chief Court Mistress to Maria Alexandrovna (Marie of Hesse and by Rhine) 1855–1880

 1855–1863: Yekaterina Saltykov (in position since 1840)

Chief Court Mistress to Maria Feodorovna (Dagmar of Denmark) 1881–1917
 1881–1881: Princess Julia Kurakina (in position since 1866)
 1881–1888: Princess Hélene Kotchoubey
 1888–1906: Countess Anna Stroganoff

Chief Court Mistress to Alexandra Feodorovna (Alix of Hesse) 1894–1917
 1894–1910: Maria Golitzyna
 1910–1917: Elizaveta Narishkina

Sweden 

In Sweden, the Chief Court Mistress is the second highest-ranking official of the royal household, preceded only by the Marshal of the Realm. She ranks immediately below the members of the royal family, the speaker of the Parliament and the prime minister, and has precedence over former speakers of the Parliament and former prime ministers. The incumbent is Kirstine von Blixen-Finecke, who has served from 2016.

The title and position have changed over time. Before the reign of Queen Christina (1632–1654), the title was generally referred to as hovmästarinna (Court Mistress), but during and after the reign of Christina, it became the custom to have two such Court mistresses subordinate to one överhovmästarinna (Chief Court Mistress). Only the Queen and the Queen Dowager had a Chief Court Mistress called överhovmästarinna (the Chief Court Mistress) while the equivalent at the courts of other female members of the royal house was called hovmästarinna (Court Mistress). 

The position was the highest a female courtier could have in the Swedish royal court, and the överhovmästarinna was ranked an Excellency, something unusual for a woman in the 17th century, which placed her immediately after the female members of the royal house in rank. Her role was to uphold etiquette at court, and receive and carry out the instructions of the Queen in the management of the court. She managed the employment of new members to the court of the Queen, and every meeting and letter to the Queen passed through her. She also managed the ceremony of the court presentation, in which nobles were presented to the royal family and thus allowed to show themselves officially at court. She could also represent the Queen on some occasions at court ceremonies and parties as hostess.

Chief Court Mistress to Catherine Stenbock 1552–1621
 1552–1568: Anna Hogenskild

Chief Court Mistress to Karin Månsdotter 1567–1568
 1567–1569: Elin Andersdotter

Chief Court Mistress to Catherine Jagellon 1568–1583
 1568–1583: Karin Gyllenstierna

Chief Court Mistress to Gunilla Bielke 1585–1597
 1587–1592: Kerstin Oxenstierna

Chief Court Mistress to Christina of Holstein-Gottorp 1604–1625
 1604–1608: Carin Ulfsdotter Snakeborg 
 1608–1612: Gunilla Jönsdotter Struss 
 1612–1619: Carin Kyle

Chief Court Mistress to Maria Eleonora of Brandenburg 1620–1655

 1620–1623: Hebbla Eriksdotter Stålarm 
 Catharina von Schnideck 
 Regina Catharina von Windisch-Grätz 
 1628–1633: Brita Gylta 
 1633–1634: Ebba Leijonhufvud
 1634–1639: Elisabeth Gyllenstierna
 1639–1640: Christina Posse 
1640–1649: Vacant
 1649–1655: Görvel Posse

Chief Court Mistress to Christina 1632–1654
During the reign of Christina, the office was often shared by several people. 

 1633–1634: Ebba Leijonhufvud
 1634–1639: Elisabeth Gyllenstierna
 1639–1642: Ebba Ryning  (jointly with Beata Oxenstierna)
 1639–1647: Beata Oxenstierna  (jointly with Ebba Ryning)
 1644–1648: Margareta Brahe  (jointly with Kerstin Bååt)
 1645–1650: Kerstin Bååt  (jointly with Margareta Brahe)
 1650: Barbro Fleming (jointly with Maria Sofia De la Gardie)
 1651–1654: Maria Sofia De la Gardie (jointly with Barbro Fleming)

Chief Court Mistress to Hedvig Eleonora of Holstein-Gottorp, 1654–1715

 1655–1660: Elisabet Carlsdotter Gyllenhielm
 1660–1664: Görwel Bååt
 1664–1671: Görvel Posse
 1671–1686: Occa Maria Johanna von Riperda  
 1686–1715: Märta Berendes (equivalent position at the court of the princesses in 1687–1717)

Chief Court Mistress to Ulrika Eleonora of Denmark, 1680–1693
 1680–1693: Maria Elisabeth Stenbock

Chief Court Mistress to Ulrika Eleonora 1718–1741
 1717–1736: Katarina Ebba Horn af Åminne 
 1736–1741: Hedvig Elisabet Strömfelt (equivalent position to the Crown princess in 1744–1751)

Chief Court Mistress to Louisa Ulrika of Prussia, 1751–1782

 1751–1751: Hedvig Elisabet Strömfelt
 1751–1754: Ulla Tessin
 1754–1761: Ulrica Catharina Stromberg 
 1761–1765: Ulrika Juliana Gyllenstierna
 1765–1771: Brita Stina Sparre
 1771–1782: Fredrika Eleonora von Düben

Chief Court Mistress to Sophia Magdalena of Denmark, 1771–1813

 1771–1777: Anna Maria Hjärne 
 1777–1780: Ulrika Strömfelt
 1780–1795: Charlotta Sparre
 1795–1813: Hedvig Eva De la Gardie

Chief Court Mistress to Frederica of Baden, 1797–1809

 1795–1805: Hedvig Catharina Piper 
 1805–1810: Lovisa Sophia von Fersen

Chief Court Mistress to Hedvig Elisabeth Charlotte of Holstein-Gottorp, 1809–1818

 1809–1810: Lovisa Sophia von Fersen 
 1811–1818: Christina Charlotta Stjerneld 
 1818–1818: Caroline Lewenhaupt
 1818–1818: Charlotta Aurora De Geer

Chief Court Mistresss to Désirée Clary, 1823–1861
 1823–1829: Marcelle Tascher de la Pagerie
 1829–1844: Vilhelmina Gyldenstolpe

Chief Court Mistress to Josephine of Leuchtenberg, 1844–1876
 1844–1866: Charlotta Skjöldebrand

Chief Court Mistress to Louise of the Netherlands, 1859–1872
 1859–1860: Stefanie Hamilton
 1860–1869: Wilhelmina Bonde
 1871–1872: Anne-Malène Wachtmeister

Chief Court Mistress to Sophia of Nassau, 1872–1907
 1872–1879: Elisabet Augusta Piper
 1880–1890: Malvina De la Gardie
 1890–1907: Ebba Åkerhielm

Chief Court Mistress to Victoria of Baden, 1907–1931
 1907–1908: Vacant
 1908–1931: Augusta Lewenhaupt

See also
 Mistress of the Robes, British equivalent 
 Camarera mayor de Palacio, Spanish equivalent 
 Première dame d'honneur, French equivalent 
 Surintendante de la Maison de la Reine, French equivalent

References

Court titles
Royal households
Danish courtiers
German courtiers
Swedish courtiers
Austrian courtiers
Austrian monarchy
Danish monarchy
Swedish monarchy
Swedish court titles
Danish court titles